Symploce is a genus of cockroach in the family Ectobiidae.

Species
These 66 species belong to the genus Symploce:

 Symploce armigera Princis, 1962 c g
 Symploce bicolor (Palisot De Beauvois, 1805) c g
 Symploce bidiensis Roth, L. M., 1985 c g
 Symploce bifida Princis, 1962 c g
 Symploce bispot Feng & Woo, 1988 g
 Symploce bispota Woo & P.  Feng, 1988 c g
 Symploce breviramis (Hanitsch, 1929) c g
 Symploce cristata Rehn, J. A. G. & Hebard, 1927 c g
 Symploce digitifera Rehn, J. A. G., 1922 c g
 Symploce disema Hebard, 1929 c g
 Symploce divisa Princis, 1963 c g
 Symploce flagellata Hebard, 1916 c g
 Symploce furcata (Shiraki, 1931) c g
 Symploce gigas Asahina, 1979 c g
 Symploce hebardi Princis, 1969 c g
 Symploce incerta (Hanitsch, 1929) c g
 Symploce incuriosa (Saussure, 1899) c g
 Symploce indica (Brunner von Wattenwyl, 1865) c g
 Symploce jamaicana (Rehn, J. A. G., 1903) c g
 Symploce japonica (Shelford, 1907) c g
 Symploce jariverensis Roth, L. M., 1986 c g
 Symploce javana Hebard, 1929 c g
 Symploce kanemensis Roth, L. M., 1987 c g
 Symploce kenyensis Chopard, 1938 c g
 Symploce kibalituriensis Roth, L. M., 1986 c g
 Symploce kumari Roth, L. M., 1986 c g
 Symploce larvata (Hanitsch, 1929) c g
 Symploce lunaris (Shelford, 1911) c g
 Symploce lundi Roth, L. M., 1987 c g
 Symploce macroptera (Walker, F., 1868) c g
 Symploce marshallae Kumar, 1975 c g
 Symploce microphthalma Izquierdo & Medina, 1992 c g
 Symploce miyakoensis Asahina, 1974 c g
 Symploce modesta (Brunner von Wattenwyl, 1893) c g
 Symploce morsei Hebard, 1916 i c g b
 Symploce munda Gurney, 1942 c g
 Symploce natalensis (Walker, F., 1868) c g
 Symploce nigroalba (Hanitsch, 1927) c g
 Symploce okinoerabuensis Asahina, 1974 c g
 Symploce pallens (Stephens, 1835) i c g
 Symploce paralarvata Roth, L. M., 1985 c g
 Symploce pararuficollis Roth, L. M., 1994 c g
 Symploce perpulchra (Shelford, 1907) c g
 Symploce quadrispinis Woo & P.  Feng, 1992 c g
 Symploce relucens (Gerstaecker, 1883) c g
 Symploce royi Princis, 1963 c g
 Symploce ruficollis (Fabricius, 1787) c g
 Symploce sikorae (Saussure, 1891) c g
 Symploce singaporensis Roth, L. M., 1985 c g
 Symploce somaliensis Roth, L. M., 1986 c g
 Symploce stellatus Feng, P.  & Woo, 1999 c g
 Symploce striata (Shiraki, 1906) c g
 Symploce strinatii Roth, L. M., 1988 c g
 Symploce stupida Roth, L. M., 1999 c g
 Symploce sudanica Rehn, J. A. G., 1926 c g
 Symploce termitina (Saussure, 1863) c g
 Symploce testacea (Shiraki, 1908) c g
 Symploce togoana Roth, L. M., 1987 c g
 Symploce torchaceus Feng, P.  & Woo, 1999 c g
 Symploce transita Bei-Bienko, 1964 c g
 Symploce triangulifera Princis, 1963 c g
 Symploce unistyla Roth, L. M., 1985 c g
 Symploce walkeri Princis, 1969 c g
 Symploce wulingensis Feng, P.  & Woo, 1993 c g
 Symploce yayeyamana Asahina, 1979 c g
 Symploce zarudniana Bei-Bienko, 1950 c g

Data sources: i = ITIS, c = Catalogue of Life, g = GBIF, b = Bugguide.net

References

Cockroaches
Articles created by Qbugbot